To Love is a 1968 Soviet drama film directed by Mikhail Kalik and Inna Tumanyan.

Plot 
The film consists of four short stories, each of which asks the audience a question: "What is love?"

Cast 
 Mihail Badiceanu as Moraru
 Natalya Chetverikova as Vera
 Alexey Eybozhenko as guy at the party
 Alisa Freyndlikh as Anna
 Valentin Nikulin as lonely guest
 Yekaterina Vasilyeva as Igor's girlfriend
 Anastasia Voznesenskaya as girl with a globe
 Naum Kavunovsky as hotel manager
 Svetlana Svetlichnaya as northerner
 Igor Kvasha as Igor
 Andrei Mironov as guy at the party
 Alexander Men as cameo

References

External links 
 

1968 films
1960s Russian-language films
Soviet drama films
1968 drama films
Gorky Film Studio films
Soviet black-and-white films
Soviet romantic drama films